Home Minister is an Indian Marathi reality game show which is aired on Zee Marathi. It was started on 13 September 2004. It is the Zee Marathi's third longest-running Indian television series in Marathi TV shows.

Concept 
The show has the format that Aadesh Bandekar visits different homes in different cities and plays the various games with women who calls him "Bhauji". The show has various type of games and Aadesh Bandekar also chat with women and their families. Every episode winner receives a saree called Paithani.

Seasons 
 Navvadhu No. 1 (14 September 2009)
 Jaubai Jorat (14 January 2011)
 Swapna Gruhlaxmiche (16 May 2011)
 Manachi Paithani (21 May 2012)
 Honar Sun Me Hya Gharchi (31 March 2014)
 Goa Special (25 April 2016)
 Kahe Diya Pardes (15 May 2016)
 Chuk Bhul Dyavi Ghyavi (13 February 2017)
 Lagira Jhala Ji (1 May 2017)
 Aggabai Sasubai (19 August 2019)
 Bharat Daura (1 January 2020)
 Gharchya Ghari (8 June 2020) 
 Covid Yoddha Vishesh (27 July 2020)
 Majha Babdya (7 September 2020)
 Sasubai Majhya Laybhari (11 October 2020)
 Paithani Maherchya Angani (4 January 2021)
 Little Champs (26 July 2021)
 Maha Minister (11 April 2022)
 Khel Sakhyancha Charchaughincha (27 June 2022)
 Sasubai Khas Sunbai Zhakas (28 November 2022)

Other seasons 
 Dilya Ghari Tu Sukhi Raha
 Utsav Natyancha, Maitricha Aani Aaplya Mansancha
 Nanda Saukhya Bhare
 Maharashtrachi Mahaminister
 Pandharichi Wari Vishesh

Production
Jitendra Joshi was replaced show's regular anchor Aadesh Bandekar in 2009 while Aadesh was contesting Maharashtra State Assembly election. He was hosting the season Navvadhu No.1. In 2011, Nilesh Sable was the host of this show. Nilesh was hosting the season Jaubai Jorat.

The series premiered on 14 January 2011 from Monday to Saturday at 6.30 pm by replacing Sade Made Teen. The show was stopped on 1 May 2010 with 1616 episodes due to the Aadesh Bandekar participated in the Maharashtra State Election and it again started with new season from 14 January 2011.

Reception

Ratings

Special episode

1 hour 
 15 June 2011 (6 pm)
 19 February 2012 (6 pm)
 20 October 2013 (6 pm)
 22 March 2015 (6 pm)
 19 July 2015 (7 pm)
 30 August 2015 (7 pm)
 22 October 2015 (6 pm)
 21 August 2016 (7 pm)
 25 September 2016 (7 pm)
 17 September 2017 (7 pm)
 26 November 2017 (7 pm)
 2 September 2018 (7 pm)
 15 August 2019 (6 pm)
 13 September 2019 (6 pm)
 27 October 2019 (7 pm)
 7 February 2021 (7 pm)
 15 January 2023 (6 pm)

2 hours 
 31 March 2014 (Shree-Janhavi)
 15 January 2017 (Makar Sankranti Special)
 13 August 2017 (Jui-Mallika)
 21 October 2018 (Nilesh Sable)
 10 February 2019 (Anandi Gopal Film)
 18 July 2021 (Kartiki Gaikwad)

References

External links 
 Home Minister at ZEE5
 
 

Indian reality television series
2004 Indian television series debuts
Indian game shows
Zee Marathi original programming
Marathi-language television shows
2010 Indian television series endings
2011 Indian television series debuts